Lilian Jackson Braun (June 20, 1913June 4, 2011) was an American writer known for her light-hearted series of The Cat Who... mystery novels. The Cat Who books features newspaper journalist Jim Qwilleran, eventually retired, and his two Siamese cats, Koko (short for Kao K'o Kung) and Yum Yum, first in an unnamed midwestern American city and then in the fictitious small town of Pickax located in Moose County "400 miles north of everywhere". Although never explicitly located in the books, the towns, counties, and lifestyles portrayed in the series are generally accepted to be modeled after Bad Axe, Michigan, where Braun resided with her husband until the mid-1980s.

Life and career
Born Lilian Jackson in the Willimansett neighborhood of Chicopee, Massachusetts, to Charles and Clara Ward Jackson, she began her writing career as a teenager, contributing sports poetry to the Detroit News. She went on to write advertising copy for many Detroit department stores. At the Detroit Free Press she worked 30 years as the "Good Living" editor and retired in 1978.

Braun wrote a series of three mystery novels published to critical acclaim from 1966 to 1968: The Cat Who Could Read Backwards, The Cat Who Ate Danish Modern, and The Cat Who Turned On and Off. The New York Times called her "the new detective of the year" in 1966. But she disappeared from the publishing scene for 18 years. In 1986 the Berkley Publishing Group continued the series, and introduced Braun to a new generation, by publishing The Cat Who Saw Red as a paperback original. During the next two years, Berkley released four more Cat Who novels in paperback and reprinted all three from the 1960s. The series rose to the top of some bestseller lists; it reached number two on the New York Times Best Seller list with its 23rd volume The Cat Who Smelled a Rat in 2001. The 29th and last completed novel in the series, The Cat Who Had 60 Whiskers was published by Penguin Group in January 2007. Like many writers of her generation, Braun was an admitted technophobe; she wrote all of her books in long hand and then typed them herself.

Little was known about Braun, who was protective of her private life. Publishers long gave incorrect birth year 1916; she was three years older, which remained unknown until she gave her true age during a 2005 interview with the Detroit News. Finally she lived in Tryon, North Carolina, with her second husband of 32 years, Earl Bettinger, and their two cats. Each of her books is dedicated to "Earl Bettinger, the Husband Who ...".

Braun died from a lung infection in June 2011, at the Hospice House of the Carolina Foothills in Landrum, South Carolina. She was preceded in death by her first husband, Louis Paul Braun, a sister, Florence Jackson, and a brother, Lloyd Jackson. Earl A. Bettinger (born November 24, 1923) died at the age 96 on July 20, 2020.

"The Cat Who..." novels
 The Cat Who Could Read Backwards (1966)
The Cat Who Ate Danish Modern (1967)
The Cat Who Turned On and Off (1968)
 The Cat Who Saw Red (1986) – nominated for the 1987 Anthony Award and Edgar Award, Best Paperback Original
 The Cat Who Played Brahms (1987) – nominated for the 1988 Anthony Award, Best Paperback Original
The Cat Who Played Post Office (1987)
The Cat Who Knew Shakespeare (1988)
The Cat Who Sniffed Glue (1988)
The Cat Who Went Underground (1989)
 The Cat Who Talked to Ghosts (1990)
The Cat Who Lived High (1990)
The Cat Who Knew a Cardinal (1991)
The Cat Who Moved a Mountain (1992)
The Cat Who Wasn't There (1992)
The Cat Who Went into the Closet (1993)
The Cat Who Came to Breakfast (1994)
The Cat Who Blew the Whistle (1995)
 The Cat Who Said Cheese (1996)
The Cat Who Tailed a Thief (1997)
 The Cat Who Sang for the Birds (1999)
 The Cat Who Saw Stars  (1999; copyright 1998)
 The Cat Who Robbed a Bank (2000)
 The Cat Who Smelled a Rat (2001)
 The Cat Who Went up the Creek (2002)
The Cat Who Brought Down the House (2003)
The Cat Who Talked Turkey (2004)
The Cat Who Went Bananas (2005)
The Cat Who Dropped a Bombshell (2006)
The Cat Who Had 60 Whiskers (2007)
The Cat Who Smelled Smoke – cancelled by publisher Putnam after Braun's death

Short stories
The Cat Who Had 14 Tales (1988) – 14 stories featuring cats unrelated to The Cat Who...
Short & Tall Tales: Moose County Legends Collected by James Mackintosh Qwilleran (2002) – 27 stories
The Private Life of the Cat Who...: Tales of Koko and Yum Yum from the Journals of James Mackintosh Qwilleran (2003)

References

External links
 The Cat Who Club at Tripod.com
 Works by Lilian Jackson Braun at Open Library
 

1913 births
American mystery writers
2011 deaths
Detroit Free Press people
People from Chicopee, Massachusetts
Women mystery writers
American women novelists
Novelists from Massachusetts
American women journalists
Deaths from respiratory tract infection
20th-century American novelists
21st-century American novelists
20th-century American women writers
21st-century American women writers
People from Bad Axe, Michigan
Novelists from Michigan
People from Tryon, North Carolina
20th-century American non-fiction writers
21st-century American non-fiction writers